Messier 25, also known as IC 4725, is an open cluster of stars in the southern constellation of Sagittarius. The first recorded observation of this cluster was made by Philippe Loys de Chéseaux in 1745 and it was included in Charles Messier's list of nebulous objects in 1764. The cluster is located near some obscuring features, with a dark lane passing near the center.

M25 is at a distance of about  light-years away from Earth and is 67.6 million years old. A Delta Cephei type variable star designated U Sagittarii is a member of this cluster, as are two red giants, one of which is a binary system.

See also
 List of Messier objects

References

External links
 
 Messier 25, The Messier Catalog.  Students for the Exploration and Development of Space (SEDS)
 
 Open Cluster M25. Astronomy Picture of the Day 2009 August 31

Messier 025
Orion–Cygnus Arm
Messier 025
025
IC objects
?